Mohammed Ariful Islam (born 10 January 1999) is a Bangladeshi swimmer. He competed in the men's 50 metre freestyle at the 2020 Summer Olympics.

References

External links
 

1999 births
Living people
Bangladeshi male swimmers
Bangladeshi male freestyle swimmers
Olympic swimmers of Bangladesh
Swimmers at the 2020 Summer Olympics
Place of birth missing (living people)
South Asian Games silver medalists for Bangladesh
South Asian Games medalists in swimming